Japan participated at the 2015 Summer Universiade in Gwangju, South Korea.

Medal summary

Medal by Sports

Medalists

References
 Country overview: Japan on the official website

Nations at the 2015 Summer Universiade
Japan at the Summer Universiade